Eight ships of the Royal Navy have been named HMS Atalanta or HMS Atalante after the athlete in ancient Greek mythology.

 was a 14-gun sloop launched in 1775, renamed HMS Helena in 1801 and sold in 1802.
 was a 16-gun brig-sloop captured from the French in 1797 and wrecked in 1807.
 (or Atalanta) was an 18-gun sloop launched in 1808 and wrecked in 1813. 
 was originally the letter of marque schooner Siro, which  captured in January 1814 and which the Royal Navy registered but sold apparently before she served in the Royal Navy, and which  captured in September 1814.
 was a tender launched in 1816 and transferred to the Customs service the following year.
 was a 16-gun brig launched in 1847 and broken up in 1868.
She was renamed HMS Mariner in January 1878 and then HMS Atalanta two weeks later. She disappeared in 1880 while serving as a training ship and was presumed to have foundered in a storm.
 armed yacht, pennant 020. Originally Lorena, in naval service from 5 June 1915 to 21 February 1919.

Indian Marine
 was a wooden paddle sloop of 606 tons (bm), 210HP, and five guns, launched by Wigrams & Green, Blackwall, on 14 May 1836 for the British East India Company's naval arm in India. However, she ended up spending some 20 years as a mail packet until she was broken in the 1850s.

References

Royal Navy ship names